Asen Velikov (born January 11, 1985) is a Bulgarian professional basketball player, who is currently playing for Levski Sofia in the Bulgarian League, as a point guard. Velikov was born in Pleven.

References

External links
Eurobasket Profile
RealGM Profile
Eurosport Profile
Euroleague Profile
FIBA Profile

1985 births
Living people
BC Levski Sofia players
BC Rilski Sportist players
Bulgarian men's basketball players
PBC Academic players
Sportspeople from Pleven
Point guards